Systematic Botany is a peer-reviewed scientific journal covering the study of systematic botany. It is published quarterly by the American Society of Plant Taxonomists. According to the Journal Citation Reports, the journal has a 2010 impact factor of 1.897.

Systematic Botany was established in spring 1976 under founding editor-in-chief William Louis Culberson (Duke University). The current editor-in-chief is James F. Smith (Boise State University).

The American Society of Plant Taxonomists also publishes the peer-reviewed taxonomic monograph series, Systematic Botany Monographs since 1980.

Abstracting and indexing
Systematic Botany is abstracted and indexed in Agricola,  Agris, BioOne, PubMed, Scirus, and Science Citation Index Expanded.

References

External links 
 
 Systematic Botany Monographs

Publications established in 1976
Botany journals
English-language journals
Quarterly journals
Academic journals published by learned and professional societies